Johann Wilhelm Schirmer (5 September 1807 in Jülich – 11 September 1863 in Karlsruhe) was a German landscape artist born in Jülich, within the Prussian Duchy of Jülich.

Biography

Schirmer was started as a student of historical painting under Schadow at the academy of Düsseldorf. Later, he came under the influence of Carl Friedrich Lessing and landscape painting and began painting historical landscapes in the manner of Nicolas Poussin. He became known as one of the first of the Düsseldorf school of painting.

In 1830 he became an Assistant Professor, and later, in 1839, a Professor at the Düsseldorf Academy. In the meantime, he visited and painted in Belgium, the Black Forest, Switzerland, the Netherlands, Normandy and Italy. In 1854, he took up the role of a Director at the Art School at Karlsruhe, where he died.

This artist is sometimes confused with August Wilhelm Ferdinand Schirmer, who had similar interests, and belonged to the same era. In addition, both were known by the name Wilhelm Schirmer, and were students of Wilhelm von Schadow, although at different academic institutions.

Characteristic works
Schirmer created romantic, classical and Biblical landscapes, such as: 
 The Grotto of Egeria (1842), in the Leipzig Museum
 Twelve Scenes from the History of Abraham (1859–62), in the National Gallery at Berlin
 An Italian Park at Berlin
 Nether German landscape at Leipzig
 A series of 26 Biblical landscapes at the Düsseldorf gallery
 Good Samaritan (1857), four landscapes at Karlsruhe

Notes

References
 
 
Attribution

External links

1807 births
1863 deaths
People from Jülich
19th-century German painters
19th-century German male artists
German male painters
German landscape painters
People from the Rhine Province
Kunstakademie Düsseldorf alumni
Campagna Romana
Düsseldorf school of painting